Stasander (lived 4th century B.C.) was a Soloian general in the service of Alexander the Great. Upon Alexander's death he became the satrap of  Aria and Drangiana. He lost control of his satrapies after being defeated by the Antigonids in the Wars of the Diadochi.

Biography

Stasander was born in the Kingdom of Soloi, in the 4th century B.C. At the time of his birth the ten city-kingdoms of Cyprus were vassal states of the Achaemenid Empire (Persians) which had conquered them either in 546 or 526. In May 334, the Achaemenids came into conflict with Kingdom of Macedon ruled by Alexander the Great. The Cypriots and Phoenicians formed the core of the Persian navy in the Mediterranean consisting of 400 ships. Upon receiving news of the devastating Persian defeat at the Battle of Issus, the Cypriot kingdoms defected to the Macedonians assembling at Sidon in the middle of May 332. Alexander pardoned the Cypriots on account that their allegiance to the Persians was a matter of duress. Cypriots took part in Alexander's numerous conquests starting from the Siege of Tyre. Stasander and his brother Stasanor were among those who entered the service of Macedon, eventually becoming  Alexander's companions, an inner circle of his most trusted generals. Their rapid promotion may have been due to the fact that they belonged to the royal house of Soloi.

Alexander ordered Stasanor to arrest Arsaces the satrap of Aria. Stasanor consequently assumed power in the satrapy himself. In 323, Alexander died and his empire was partitioned among his generals. As a result of the 321 Partition of Triparadisus Stasanor was granted the satrapies of Bactria and Sogdiana, whilst Stasander took over Aria and Drangiana. During the course of the Wars of the Diadochi  he sided with Eumenes against Antigonus I Monophthalmus. He was defeated by the Antigonids at the Battle of Gabiene. Antigonus ultimately defeated  Eumenes and his allies giving Stasander's satrapies to Euitus. The date of Stasander's death is unknown.

See also
Stasanor, another Cypriot general of Alexander the Great from Soli

Footnotes

References

 
 

Ancient Greek generals
Generals of Alexander the Great
Ancient Cypriots
Satraps of the Alexandrian Empire
4th-century BC Greek people
Year of birth unknown
Year of death unknown